Kabba/Bunu is a Local Government Area in Kogi State, Nigeria. Its headquarters are in the town of Kabba on the A123 highway in the southwest of the area at.
 

The postal code of the area is 261.

Languages
The people of Kabba/Bunu generally speak Okun which is the language of the Yoruba-speaking community in Kogi State.  However, there is a little difference in the way the language is spoken within the Local Government Area. The Kabba people pride themselves as the native speaker of the Owé dialect while those from Bunu district refers to theirs as Èdè Abinu.

Politics 
Since Kabba/Bunu comprises two districts (Kabba and Bunu), the Chairmanship position is rotated between the two components with the Deputy Chairmanship position going in the opposite direction.

The incumbent Chairman of the Local Government is Hon. Moses Olorunleke of the All Progressives Congress.

References

Local Government Areas in Kogi State